Archias, son of Anaxidotus from Pella, was a Macedonian officer and geographer who served as Trierarch under Admiral Nearchus. Archias was despatched with a galley of 30 oars, and reached the island of Failaka (Kuwait) and Tylos (Bahrain group). Tylos, Archias reported, was "about a day and a night's sail" from the mouth of the Euphrates.

References
Who's Who in the Age of Alexander the Great: Prosopography of Alexander's Empire - Page 42 by Waldemar Heckel 
Anabasis Alexandri Book Viii Indica Easy: Book VIII (Indica) Page 40 By Arrian 
Ancient Greek Mariners Page 187 By Walter Woodburn Hyde

Geographers of Alexander the Great
Ancient Pellaeans
Ancient Greek explorers
4th-century BC Macedonians
Ancient Macedonian geographers
Trierarchs of Nearchus' fleet
Explorers of Arabia